Santa Maria della Neve may refer to:

 Santa Maria della Neve, Pisogne,  Roman Catholic church in Pisogne, Italy
 Santa Maria della Neve, Bologna, former Roman-Catholic church, in Bologna, Italy
 Santa Maria della Neve al Portico, Roman Catholic church and convent located in Florence, Italy

See also 

 Santa Maria (disambiguation)